Viiding is an Estonian surname, and may refer to:

 Arnold Viiding (1911–2006), shot putter and discus thrower
 Bernhard Viiding (1932–2001), journalist, publicist, prosaist and poet
 Elo Viiding (Elo Vee; born 1974), poet. Daughter of Juhan Viiding, granddaughter of Paul Viiding 
 Juhan Viiding (1948–1995), poet and actor. Son of Paul Viiding, father of Elo Viiding
 Paul Viiding (1904–1962) poet, author and literary critic. Father of Juhan Viiding, grandfather of Elo Viiding

Estonian-language surnames